NeuroTribes: The Legacy of Autism and the Future of Neurodiversity is a book by Steve Silberman that discusses autism and neurodiversity from historic, scientific, and advocacy-based perspectives. Neurotribes was awarded the Samuel Johnson Prize in 2015, and has received wide acclaim from both the scientific and the popular press. It was named to a number of "best books of 2015" lists, including The New York Times Book Review and The Guardian.

Reactions 
In The New York Times Book Review, Jennifer Senior wrote that the book was "beautifully told, humanizing, important"; The Boston Globe called it "as emotionally resonant as any [book] this year"; and in Science, the cognitive neuroscientist Francesca Happé wrote, "It is a beautifully written and thoughtfully crafted book, a historical tour of autism, richly populated with fascinating and engaging characters, and a rallying call to respect difference." It was named one of the best books of 2015 by The New York Times, The Economist, Financial Times, and The Guardian. By contrast, Lisa Conlan criticized Silberman's retrospective diagnosis of historical figures and argued that his portrayal of neurodiversity is based in identity politics. James Harris of Johns Hopkins University criticized NeuroTribes as a book that pushes an agenda, saying that Silberman misrepresented Leo Kanner as somebody that had a negative view towards persons with autism and their parents, rather than, as Harris argued, an advocate for individualized treatment for every child.

In 2017, Paramount Pictures acquired the rights to NeuroTribes and announced interest in making the book into a movie with Broadway Video.

Awards and honors
2015 Samuel Johnson Prize
2015 Books for a Better Life Psychology Award, Southern New York National Multiple Sclerosis Society
2016 Health Book of the Year, Medical Journalists' Association
2016 Silver Medal, Nonfiction, California Book Awards 
2016 Erikson Institute Prize for Excellence in Mental Health Media
2016 ARC Catalyst Awards Author of the Year

See also
 Autism rights movement
 Ole Ivar Løvaas

References

External links
 NeuroTribes: The Legacy of Autism and the Future of Neurodiversity

2015 non-fiction books
American non-fiction books
Books about autism
Avery Publishing books